Neobrachychilus consobrinus is a species of beetle in the family Cerambycidae, and the only species in the genus Neobrachychilus. It was described by Lane in 1939.

References

Phacellini
Beetles described in 1939